Dalby is a rural town and locality in the Western Downs Region, Queensland, Australia.

It is on the Darling Downs and is the administrative centre for the Western Downs Region.

Geography 
State Route 82 also passes through Dalby. It enters from the north as Dalby–Jandowae Road and exits to the south as Dalby–Cecil Plains Road. Dalby-Cooyar Road exits to the east. Dalby is the centre of Australia's richest grain and cotton growing area.

Western railway line 
The Western railway line passes through Dalby with a number of railway stations serving the locality:

 Baining railway station
 Yarrala railway station, now closed
 Tycanba railway station
 Dalby railway station in Hunter Street serving the town
 Blaxland railway station

Glenmorgan railway line 
The Glenmorgan railway line branches from the Western railway line just west of the Dalby railway station with the following railway stations within the locality of Dalby":

Yumborra railway station, now closed
 Dalby West railway station
Natcha railway station, serving the Dalby Butter Factory, now closed

Bell Branch railway line 
The now-closed Bell Branch railway line also branched from the Western railway line with the following railway stations within the locality of Dalby:

 Bonyumba railway station
Sanatorium railway station, serving the Dalby Sanatorium
 Mocattas Corner railway station

Airports 
Dalby Aerodrome is an airport.

There is a heliport at Dalby Hospital.

History

Baranggum (also known as Barrunggam, Barunggam Parrungoom, Murrumgama) is an Australian Aboriginal language spoken by the Baranggum people. The Baranggum language region includes the landscape within the local government boundaries of the Western Downs Regional Council, particularly Dalby, Tara, Jandowae and west towards Chinchilla.

Dalby was founded in the early 1840s at a place known locally as "The Crossing" on Myall Creek, a tributary of the Condamine River. The first settler was Henry Dennis, who explored the region and chose land for himself and others in the locality. Today an obelisk in Edward Street denotes the location where Dennis camped.

A small settlement was founded to assist travellers heading north to nearby Jimbour Station. The explorer Ludwig Leichhardt visited the area in 1844, on his way to Port Essington.

In February 1853, the New South Wales government sent the Deputy Surveyor General Captain Samuel Perry to the area to survey a township. In August of the following year, Charles Douglas Eastaughffe arrived with a document under the Seal of the NSW Government officially proclaiming 'Dalby' a township. Eastaughffe was later appointed Chief Constable and remained in Dalby until his retirement.

The name of the town is believed to come from the village of Dalby on the Isle of Man and reflects immigration from the Isle of Man in the mid-19th century. The name was apparently chosen by Captain Samuel Perry when he surveyed the settlement in 1853.

Myall Creek Post Office also opened in 1854 in Roche's store, with Mr Simpson as the first postmaster. It was renamed Dalby in 1855.

In 1859, Dalby became part of the new Colony of Queensland.

Dalby State School opened on 1 June 1861. In 1869 the school split into Dalby Boys State School Dalby Girls State School. In 1885 the girls' school became Dalby Girls & Infants State School. In 1893 the two schools were combined as Dalby State School. In 1914 the school expanded to include a secondary school, which closed in 1954, due to the establishment of a separate secondary school, Dalby State High School.

In August 1863, Dalby was officially proclaimed a municipality, the Borough of Dalby, in the Queensland Government Gazette.

Dalby Non-Vested School opened as a Roman Catholic girls school in 1864 and in 1866 became a non-vested school (the teachers' salaries were paid by the Queensland Government but the government did not operate the school). Circa 1880, the school either closed or continued without government funding.

On Sunday 5 August 1866, Bishop James Quinn dedicated St Joseph's Catholic Church.

Dalby was linked by the Western railway line to Ipswich on 16 April 1868.

On Sunday 20 June 1869, the first Presbyterian church was opened in Dalby. Reverend George Grimm had conducting regular services since 1865.

St Columba's School was a Catholic primary school which was opened in 1877 by the Sisters of Mercy. In 2008, it merged with St Mary's College to create Our Lady of the Southern Cross College.

From 1873 to 1949, the electoral district of Dalby was an electoral district of the Legislative Assembly of Queensland.

Dalby was believed to have a healthy climate and in October 1900 the Queensland Government opened the Jubilee Sanitorium for consumptive patients. The name Jubilee commemorates the Diamond Jubilee of Queen Victoria. In 1904 the Dalby Town Council erected therapeutic thermal baths using artesian water from a local bore for those wishing to improve their health by "taking the waters". In 1938, the council closed the artesian baths as interest in "taking the waters" was declining. Medical opinion became increasingly doubtful of the benefits of bathing in mineral waters, favouring drugs and physiotherapy as better treatments. It closed in January 1938 with its remaining patients transferred to Westwood Sanatorium.

Kincora Provisional School opened in 1908 "via Dalby" and was renamed Moonie River Provisional School circa December 1908. It closed circa 1916.

On 8 December 1912, the Dalby Methodist Church in Condamine Street was officially opened by the Reverend Henry Youngman, the President of the Queensland Methodist Conference. Im March 1949 it was announced that a new church would be built with the original church to be moved on the site and be used as a church hall. On 1 October 1949 the foundation stone for the new Dalby Methodist Church was laid by Reverend Henry William Prouse, the President of the Queensland Methodist Conference. Construction commenced in May 1950, but there were delays in obtaining building materials until August 1951. The new church was dedicated on Saturday 8 December 1951 by Reverend Tom Hardy Blackburn. When the Methodist Church amalgamated into the Uniting Church in Australia in 1977, it became the Dalby Uniting Church.

The Dalby War Memorial was unveiled by the Queensland Governor, Matthew Nathan, on 26 July 1922.

The Paragon Cafe was purchased in 1935 by Milton (Miltiadis) Dimitrios Samios part of the cultural phenomenon of Greek cafes in Queensland. Paragon Cafe employed three men and six women with taking increasing from 90 pounds to 200 pounds within the first year of trading.

The Dalby Olympic Swimming Pool complex was constructed in 1936 and is the earliest identified Olympic standard pool in Queensland constructed outside Brisbane.

Dalby State High School opened on 2 February 1954. Bunya Campus was acquired by Dalby State High School at the start of 2011 and has since provided students who live out of the catchment area the opportunity to attend Dalby State High School and participate in all it has to offer as a boarding student.

St Mary's College was a Catholic secondary school opened on 21 January 1963 by the Christian Brothers. In 2008, it merged with St Columba's School to create Our Lady of the Southern Cross College.

Dalby South State School opened on 29 March 1965.

Dalby Christian School was opened on 1 February 1981 by the Dalby Gospel Chapel.

The Christian Outreach College opened on 28 January 1984. It closed on 18 September 1991.

In 2004, Dalby began treating its water with state-of-the-art reverse osmosis process. The first Reverse Osmosis plant, opened in 2004, was the first in Queensland. The second and larger plant opened in 2011.

In 2006, the opening of Dalby Shoppingworld at the northern end of Cunningham Street has brought new life to the Dalby CBD. The centre includes Woolworths, Big W, Amcal and other specialty shops. As part of nationwide restructuring, Target Country closed its store in January 2021 and was replaced by K Hub, which opened in February.

Dalby Library opened in 2014.

Aboriginal and Torres Strait Islander people made up 7.0% of the population. 84.0% of people were born in Australia. The next most common countries of birth were Philippines 1.9%, New Zealand 1.3%, England 1.1% and South Africa 0.8%. 88.7% of people spoke only English at home. Other languages spoken at home included Tagalog at 1.0%. The most common responses for religion were Catholic 26.3%, Anglican 19.6% and No Religion 16.9%.

In 2016, Dalby's population was increasing rapidly with many new estates created and subdivisions made. Some notable new estates include Sunnyside Estate, Heritage Gardens, Callistemon Park and a new estate on the Warrego Highway side of Sandalwood Avenue.

Heritage listings 

Dalby has a number of heritage-listed sites, including:

 133 Cunningham Street: former Dalby Town Council Chambers and Offices
 153 Cunningham Street: St John's Anglican Church
 169 Cunningham Street: St Columba's Convent
 21 New Street: Dalby Fire Station
 28B Nicholson Street: Dalby State High School
 Patrick Street: Dalby War Memorial and Gates
 58 Patrick Street: Dalby Olympic Swimming Pool

Economy 
Industry in Dalby includes large-scale engineering, coal mining, and fuels (ethanol). Dalby is the centre of a diverse and productive agricultural area with rich black soil allowing the production of crops such as wheat, cotton and sorghum. Livestock raising including pigs, cattle and sheep is also popular. Two cotton gins are situated within  of the town.

Dalby is to be the site of the first dry mill grain-to-ethanol plant constructed in Australia (the first plant built specifically for the production of ethanol for fuel since World War II).

Power
The local area is developing an energy-based economy with a large coal-fired power station and a number of coal mines and natural gas bores being established to the west of Dalby. A local company has been awarded a contract to establish wind turbines on adjacent farm land.

This A$1.2 billion project is a 750-megawatt coal-fired power station, with adjacent coal mine being developed at the small town of Kogan, which is roughly equidistant between Dalby, Chinchilla, and Tara.

Local media 
There are two locally published newspapers, the Dalby Herald and Northern Downs News, as well as the Dalby Magazine.

Dalby also has its own community radio station, 88.9 4DDD, which was founded on 26 January 1992.

Dalby receives most commercial and ABC radio and television services from Toowoomba, the nearest regional city. Local news stories from Dalby and other Western Downs communities are often featured on WIN News, a regional television news bulletin compiled in Toowoomba.

Education
Dalby State School is a government primary (Prep-6) school for boys and girls at 155 Cunningham Street. In 2017, the school had an enrollment of 579 students with 43 teachers (39 full-time equivalent) and 35 non-teaching staff (23 full-time equivalent). It is one of the oldest state primary schools in Queensland.

Our Lady of the Southern Cross College is a Catholic primary and secondary (Prep-12) school for boys and girls at 2 Nicholson Street. In 2017, the school had an enrollment of 594 students with 48 teachers (44 full-time equivalent) and 31 non-teaching staff (20 full-time equivalent).

Dalby State High School is a government secondary (7-12) school for boys and girls at 26 Nicholson Street. In 2017, the school had an enrollment of 1040 students with 94 teachers (89 full-time equivalent) and 71 non-teaching staff (54 full-time equivalent). It includes a special education program. The school has a boarding facility for boys and girls at 463 Bunya highway. Many students from small towns surrounding Dalby (such as Jandowae and Warra) attend Dalby State High School, as these communities do not have schools which provide senior level education. The school also performs an annual musical, usually in late May, with performances running for a full week. It is produced and directed by teachers at the school and stars students from all year levels.

Dalby South State School is a government primary (Early Childhood-6) school for boys and girls at the corner of Owen and Bunya Streets. In 2017, the school had an enrollment of 653 students with 46 teachers (43 full-time equivalent) and 32 non-teaching staff (21 full-time equivalent). It includes a special education program (Prep-10).

Dalby Christian College is a private primary and secondary (Prep-12) school for boys and girls at 2A Mary Street. It is operated by the Christian Community Ministries. In 2017, the school had an enrollment of 328 students with 25 teachers (24 full-time equivalent) and 17 non-teaching staff (13 full-time equivalent). It has an early learning centre and boarding for secondary students.

Facilities 
Water and sewerage treatment services are provided by Western Downs Regional Council. The town has made a ground-breaking deal with nearby gas companies by taking water from gas fields. It has been noted that the town will have a definite water supply for at least another 30 years, taking into account demographic trends.

There is also the Dalby Cemetery, a monumental cemetery.

Amenities 
Western Downs Regional Council operates a public library at 107 Drayton Street. It is open 10am to 5.30pm Monday to Friday and 10am to 12.30pm Saturday. Dalby Library has two Creative Studios which have the latest in content creation tools, professional equipment and software, music production and recording, and digital production and editing to help create and share projects.

St Mark's Lutheran Church is at 58A Condamine Street.

Dalby Uniting Church is at 71-73 Condamine Street.

The Springvale Kupunn branch of the Queensland Country Women's Association meets at 52 Cunningham Street.

Sport
Dalby has a strong Rugby League history with their Junior Rugby League Team, The Dalby Devils, that participate in to Toowoomba Junior Rugby League. Dalby has a Senior Rugby League Team in the Toowoomba Rugby League known as The Dalby Diehards. Condamine has a rugby union team which compete in the Darling Downs Rugby Union competition, against such teams as the University of Southern Queensland Rugby Union Club, Toowoomba Rangers Rugby Union Club, Toowoomba City Rugby Club, Roma Echidnas, the Condamine Cods, the Dalby Wheatmen, the Goondiwindi Emus, the Warwick Water Rats and the University of Queensland Rugby Union Club (Gatton Campus).

Attractions 

Dalby has a monument to the Cactoblastis cactorum in a park by the Myall Creek which runs through the town. The Argentinian caterpillar successfully eradicated the prickly pear in the 1920s.

Climate 
Dalby has a humid subtropical climate (Cfa in the Köppen climate classification) and being located just to the west of the Great Dividing Range it is hotter and less humid in summer and colder and drier in winter than nearby locations on the other side of the range. Dalby has had a recording weather station since 1893, but that was replaced in 1992 by another station at the Dalby Airport.

Dalby experienced its worst floods since 1981 in late December 2010. The town's water purification system was flooded, resulting in water restrictions that have hampered clean-up efforts. 112,500 litres (24,700 imp gal; 29,700 US gal) of water were transported to the town of 14,000 residents. In early March 2013, Dalby received another severe flood, cutting the town in two after  of rain was recorded over a few days. Flood waters peaked at 3.21 meters and a number of homes received water damage.

Notable residents

 Luke and Cody Cook, Winners of House Rules (2016)
Brodie Croft, rugby league player 
B. R. Dionysius, poet
Jayson Gillham, classical pianist
David Gleeson, golfer
Stirling Hinchliffe, Queensland Labor politician
Jerry Jerome, stockman and boxer
Alan Jones, radio host and rugby coach
 Sir James Killen, Liberal MP for Moreton 1955–1983
George Lee, gliding champion
Jason Little, former Australian professional rugby union player
Andrew McCullough, rugby league player
Andrew McGahan, author
 Mark O'Shea, of the country music duo O'Shea
Steve Price, rugby league player
Margot Robbie, actress
John Size, Australian Racing Hall of Fame trainer
Hugh Sweeny, first Australian prisoner of war in World War II
Stephen Wilson, Paralympic athlete
Beau Fermor, rugby league player
Carl Webb- NRL, Queensland and Australian Rugby League Player

See also

 Bunya Mountains

References

Attribution

External links

Dalby Town Council official site
University of Queensland: Queensland Places: Dalby
Dalby Community
 Town map of Dalby, 1985 east west

 
Towns in Queensland
Towns in the Darling Downs
Western Downs Region
Hot springs of Australia
Localities in Queensland